London is a census designated place (CDP) in Tulare County, California, United States. The population was 1,869 at the 2010 census, up from 1,848 at the 2000 census (which was up from 1,638 in 1990).

Geography
London is located at  (36.475995, -119.442332).

Demographics

2010
The 2010 United States Census reported that London had a population of 1,869. The racial makeup of London was 761 (40.7%) White, 6 (0.3%) African American, 46 (2.5%) Native American, 0 (0.0%) Asian, 0 (0.0%) Pacific Islander, 976 (52.2%) from other races, and 80 (4.3%) from two or more races. Hispanic or Latino of any race were 1,737 persons (92.9%).

The Census reported that 1,869 people (100% of the population) lived in households, 0 (0%) lived in non-institutionalized group quarters, and 0 (0%) were institutionalized.

There were 393 households, out of which 264 (67.2%) had children under the age of 18 living in them, 217 (55.2%) were opposite-sex married couples living together, 79 (20.1%) had a female householder with no husband present, 55 (14.0%) had a male householder with no wife present.  There were 42 (10.7%) unmarried opposite-sex partnerships, and 5 (1.3%) same-sex married couples or partnerships. 20 households (5.1%) were made up of individuals, and 10 (2.5%) had someone living alone who was 65 years of age or older. The average household size was 4.76.  There were 351 families (89.3% of all households); the average family size was 4.56.

The population was spread out, with 676 people (36.2%) under the age of 18, 235 people (12.6%) aged 18 to 24, 545 people (29.2%) aged 25 to 44, 326 people (17.4%) aged 45 to 64, and 87 people (4.7%) who were 65 years of age or older.  The median age was 25.6 years. For every 100 females, there were 123.3 males.  For every 100 females age 18 and over, there were 136.2 males.

The homeowner vacancy rate was 0.6%; the rental vacancy rate was 1.7%.  691 people (37.0% of the population) lived in owner-occupied housing units and 1,178 people (63.0%) lived in rental housing units.

2000
As of the census of 2000, there were 1,848 people, 394 households, and 343 families residing in the CDP. The racial makeup of the CDP was 45.62% White, 0.11% African American, 1.14% Native American, 0.81% Asian, 49.57% from other races, and 2.76% from two or more races. Hispanic or Latino of any race were 89.83% of the population.

There were 394 households, out of which 58.1% had children under the age of 18 living with them, 54.8% were married couples living together, 18.0% had a female householder with no husband present, and 12.7% were non-families. 7.4% of all households were made up of individuals, and 2.3% had someone living alone who was 65 years of age or older.  The average household size was 4.69 and the average family size was 4.63.

In the CDP, the population was spread out, with 36.7% under the age of 18, 18.6% from 18 to 24, 29.2% from 25 to 44, 11.7% from 45 to 64, and 3.8% who were 65 years of age or older.  The median age was 23 years. For every 100 females, there were 134.2 males.  For every 100 females age 18 and over, there were 148.7 males.

The median income for a household in the CDP was $21,678, and the median income for a family was $20,524. Males had a median income of $21,964 versus $15,833 for females. The per capita income for the CDP was $5,632.  About 42.1% of families and 44.5% of the population were below the poverty line, including 55.8% of those under age 18 and 38.9% of those age 65 or over.

Government

In the United States House of Representatives, London is in

References

Census-designated places in Tulare County, California
Census-designated places in California